The 1923 William & Mary Indians football team represented the College of William & Mary as an independent during the 1923 college football season. Led by first-year head coach J. Wilder Tasker, the Indians compiled a record of 6–3.

Schedule

References

William and Mary
William & Mary Tribe football seasons
William